Stichophthalma sparta, the Manipur jungle queen, is a butterfly found in South Asia that belongs to the Morphinae subfamily of the brush-footed butterflies family.

Distribution
The Manipur jungle queen ranges from Assam (Abor Hills), Nagaland, Manipur across Myanmar (Kindat and Katha in the north; Htawgaw and Sadon in the north-east of the country, and Gokteik in the northern Shan states) onto northern Yunnan in China.

Status
Evans reports the butterfly as not rare in Sikkim and Assam and as very rare in the Naga Hills. Haribal reports the butterfly as rare in Sikkim.

Description

Upperside of both males and females ochraceous yellow suffused with a darker, somewhat brownish shade of the same towards base of forewing and on hindwing. Forewing has a postdiscal transverse row of fleur-de-lys-shaped spots, a subterminal series of broad black lunules, followed by a series of narrow crescentic marks of the ochraceous ground colour; apex and a terminal line black. Hindwing has a subterminal series of black lunules as on the forewing, giving out inwards a series of large, shafted, roundly lanceolate marks of the same colour, followed, as on the forewing, by narrow ochraceous crescentic marks and a terminal black line, the marks posteriorly rather diffuse and tending to run together. Underside ochraceous yellow, with the following transverse markings: subbasal, median, postdiscal, sub terminal and terminal dark brown sinuous lines; a discal row of dark ochraceous ocelli, six on forewing, five on hindwing: and, bordering the ocelli on the inner side, a variable diffuse dusky-black band, ending posteriorly on the hindwing in a black tornal spot. Antennae dark brown; head, thorax and abdomen ochraceous, abdomen paler beneath.

Female upperside is similar, the black markings broader and heavier. Underside also similar, but the ground colour a beautiful pale green with a silky lustre, the median transverse dark brown line outwardly bordered from costa of forewing to vein 1 of hindwing with greenish white; the dusky-black transversely discal band broader and more diffuse: forewing with seven ocelli; terminal margins broadly but lightly infuscated.

See also
List of butterflies of India
List of butterflies of India (Morphinae)
List of butterflies of India (Nymphalidae)

Cited references

References
 

Amathusiini
Butterflies of Asia
Insects of Myanmar
Environment of Manipur